The 2008 North Carolina Democratic presidential primary took place on May 6, 2008, one of the last primary elections in the long race for nomination between Barack Obama and Hillary Clinton. Obama won the primary.

North Carolina sent 134 delegates to the 2008 Democratic National Convention. 115 delegates were tied to the results of the primary, with the remainder being unelected superdelegates not pledged to any candidate. Registered Democrats and unaffiliated voters (but not registered Republicans) were allowed to participate. The polls were open from 6:30 AM to 7:30 PM, Eastern daylight time (UTC-4).  North Carolina had 5,811,778 registered voters in 2,817 precincts, with turnout at 36.42%.

Polls

Public opinion polling from early January 2008 through mid-February 2008 generally gave Senator Hillary Clinton a single digit lead over Senator Barack Obama. From then on, Obama had the lead in almost every poll, and on May 5, was up by 3%, holding 48% to her 45%. 7% were undecided, with a margin of error of 3%. The new polls gave "fresh hope" to Clinton.

Robocalls
The North Carolina state board of elections reported that misleading robocalls were made to African-American voters in the days leading up to the primary in late April 2008, which essentially told registered voters that they were not registered.
According to NPR and Facing South, these calls were made by the organization "Women's Voices Women Vote."

"Women's Voices Women Vote" included members such as former White House chief of staff John Podesta, Maggie Williams, and Page Gardner, all of whom have close ties to the Clintons. Voters and watchdog groups complained that it was a turnout-suppression effort, and the state Attorney General Roy Cooper ordered them to stop making the calls.

Results

Primary date: May 6, 2008

National pledged delegates determined: 115

The day that the North Carolina primary was held was known as Super Tuesday III. Along with Indiana which held its primary on the same day, this was largely considered the "Waterloo" of the Democratic primaries. Obama had been under fire for controversial remarks made by Jeremiah Wright, and his lead in North Carolina polls had been reduced to single digits, so Clinton's double-digit loss in that state was a major disappointment. Further hurting Clinton's campaign was the time-zone differences, as the defeat was reported in prime time, and the news of the narrow victory in Indiana had come too late. MSNBC's Tim Russert  was quoted as saying "She did not get the game-changer she wanted tonight."

See also
 Democratic Party (United States) presidential primaries, 2008
 North Carolina Republican primary, 2008

References

External links
 NC Board of Elections

2008 North Carolina elections
North Carolina
2008